The 1951 Tulane Green Wave football team represented Tulane University as a member of the Southeastern Conference (SEC) during the 1951 college football season. Led by sixth-year head coach Henry Frnka, the Green Wave played their home games at Tulane Stadium in New Orleans. Tulane finished the season with an overall record of 4–6 and a mark of 1–5 in conference play, placing last out of 12 teams in the SEC.

Schedule

References

Tulane
Tulane Green Wave football seasons
Tulane Green Wave football